Peder A. Aarøe (1868–1927) was a Norwegian trade unionist.
He was born in Stjørdalen. Aarøe was chairman of the trade union Møbelindustriarbeiderforbundet, and deputy chairman of Norges Kooperative Landsforening from 1913 to his death. He was the treasurer of the Norwegian Confederation of Trade Unions from 1915 to his death.

In 1922, Aarøe was a delegate to the Fourth Comintern Congress. Politically, he belonged to Labour.

References

1868 births
1927 deaths
People from Stjørdal
Norwegian trade union leaders
Labour Party (Norway) politicians
Norwegian cooperative organizers